Sergiu Gaibu (born 13 May 1976) is the former Minister of Economy of the Republic of Moldova.

References

1976 births
Living people
Politicians from Chișinău
Government ministers of Moldova